is a Japanese voice actress from Saitama Prefecture, Japan. She is best known for the role of Rina Fujimoto in The Idolmaster Cinderella Girls video-game and anime series.
On November 18, 2020, she announced her marriage to a non-industry man on Twitter.

Filmography

Anime
 2012 Sword Art Online as System voice (ep 14)

 2015 The Idolmaster Cinderella Girls as Rina Fujimoto

 2016 Love Live! Sunshine!! as Schoolgirl (eps 1-4)

 2017 The Idolmaster Cinderella Girls Theater Climax Season as Rina Fujimoto

ONA
 2020 The Idolmaster Cinderella Girls Theater Extra Stage as Rina Fujimoto

 2022 Cinderella Girls 10th Anniversary Celebration Animation Eternity Memories as Rina Fujimoto

Video games
 2009 Wan Wan Derby Full as An Kiryū, Ayame Yatsuhashi

 2010 Wizard and The Master: New Ground 2014 Tenkū no Craft Fleet as Maria, Mees, Mieri

 2015 The Idolmaster Cinderella Girls as Rina Fujimoto

 2015 The Idolmaster Cinderella Girls Starlight Stage as Rina Fujimoto

 2015 Phantom Beast Contract Cryptoract as Rain

 2018 Gensō Tairiku Erestria as Bella
 Girl and Dragon -Phantom Beast Contract Cryptoract- as Rain
 Hōchi Shōjo ~Hyakka Ryōran no Moe Himetachi~ as Xiang Yu, Yan Liang & Wen Chou

 2019 Arknights as Ansel

 2020 Baseball Superstars'' as Base Angel, Lucia, Ayla

References

External links

 

Living people
Japanese video game actresses
Japanese voice actresses
Voice actresses from Chiba Prefecture
21st-century Japanese actresses
Anime singers
Japanese women pop singers